Robynsiophyton vanderystii is a species of flowering plants in the family Fabaceae. It belongs to the subfamily Faboideae. It is the only member of the genus Robynsiophyton.

References

Crotalarieae
Monotypic Fabaceae genera